Wyre and Preston North is a county constituency represented in the House of Commons of the Parliament of the United Kingdom. Created in the most recent fifth periodic review of constituencies by the Boundary Commission for England, it elects one Member of Parliament (MP) by the first past the post voting system.

It was formed of parts of the Ribble Valley, Fylde and Lancaster and Wyre constituencies.

The current MP is Ben Wallace of the Conservative Party who is currently Secretary of State for Defence.

Boundaries	

It was created as the sixteenth seat of the county of Lancashire by the Boundary Commission for England prior to the 2010 general election. It contains the Fulwood and rural areas of Preston and many small towns and villages of Wyre.

The seat of Wyre and Preston North contains the Wyre towns of Poulton-le-Fylde, Garstang, St Michael's On Wyre, Catterall and parts of Thornton. From Preston are added the suburban Fulwood area and the rural parishes such as Woodplumpton, Barton, Broughton, Goosnargh and Grimsargh. The electoral wards used in the creation are:

From Preston: Cadley, College, Garrison, Greyfriars, Preston Rural East, Preston Rural North, Sharoe Green
From Wyre: Breck, Brock, Cabus, Calder, Carleton, Catterall, Garstang, Great Eccleston, Hambleton and Stalmine-with-Staynall, Hardhorn, High Cross, Norcross, Staina, Tithebarn.

Members of Parliament

Elections

Elections in the 2010s

See also
List of parliamentary constituencies in Lancashire

References

Politics of the City of Preston
Politics of Wyre
Parliamentary constituencies in North West England
Constituencies of the Parliament of the United Kingdom established in 2010